An election to South Tipperary County Council took place on 27 June 1991 as part of that year's Irish local elections. 26 councillors were elected from five electoral divisions by PR-STV voting for an eight-year term of office.

Results by party

Results by Electoral Area

Cahir

Cashel

Clonmel

Fethard

Tipperary

External links

1991 Irish local elections
1991